Crystallichthys is a genus of snailfishes native to the northern Pacific Ocean.

Species
There are currently 4 recognized species in this genus:
 Crystallichthys cameliae (Nalbant, 1965)
 Crystallichthys cyclospilus C. H. Gilbert & Burke, 1912 (Blotched snailfish)
 Crystallichthys matsushimae D. S. Jordan & Snyder, 1902 <ref
 name=Tohkairin2014>Tohkairin, A., Kai, Y., Ueda, Y., Hamatsu, T., Ito, M. & Nakabo, T. (2014): Morphological divergence between two color morphotypes of Crystallichthys matsushimae (Cottoidei: Liparidae). Ichthyological Research, 62 (2): 145-155.</ref> 
 Crystallichthys mirabilis D. S. Jordan & C. H. Gilbert, 1898

References

Liparidae
Taxa named by David Starr Jordan
Taxa named by Charles Henry Gilbert